B.T. Harvey Stadium is a stadium in Atlanta, Georgia.  It is primarily used for American football, and is the home field of the Morehouse College.

References

American football venues in Atlanta
College football venues
Morehouse Maroon Tigers football
Morehouse College